The 2012 Toray Pan Pacific Open was a women's tennis tournament played on outdoor hard courts. It was the 29th edition of the Toray Pan Pacific Open, and part of the Premier Series of the 2012 WTA Tour. It took place at the Ariake Coliseum in Tokyo, Japan, from September 23 through 29, 2012. Nadia Petrova won the singles title.

Points and prize money

Point distribution

Prize money

Singles main-draw entrants

Seeds

 1 Rankings are as of September 17, 2012

Other entrants
The following players received wildcards into the singles main draw:
  Kimiko Date-Krumm
  Caroline Garcia
  Ayumi Morita

The following players received entry from the qualifying draw:
  Camila Giorgi
  Jamie Hampton
  Bojana Jovanovski
  Johanna Larsson
  Kurumi Nara
  Pauline Parmentier
  Sílvia Soler Espinosa
  Heather Watson

The following players received entry as lucky loser:
  Andrea Hlaváčková

Withdrawals
  Maria Kirilenko (back injury)

Retirements
  Victoria Azarenka (dizziness)
  Andrea Hlaváčková (left thigh injury)
  Klára Zakopalová (left wrist injury)

Doubles main-draw entrants

Seeds

1 Rankings are as of September 17, 2012

Other entrants
The following pairs received wildcards into the doubles main draw:
  Chuang Chia-jung /  Kimiko Date-Krumm
  Daniela Hantuchová /  Peng Shuai
  Anastasia Pavlyuchenkova /  Lucie Šafářová
The following pair received entry as alternates:
  Darija Jurak /  Katalin Marosi

Withdrawals
  Andrea Hlaváčková (left thigh injury)

Champions

Singles

 Nadia Petrova def.  Agnieszka Radwańska 6–0, 1–6, 6–3

Doubles

 Raquel Kops-Jones /  Abigail Spears def.  Anna-Lena Grönefeld /  Květa Peschke 6–1, 6–4

References

External links
Official website

Toray Pan Pacific Open
Pan Pacific Open
2012 in Japanese women's sport
Toray Pan Pacific Open
Toray Pan Pacific Open
2012 Toray Pan Pacific Open